A Gift Of Dragons is a 2002 collection of short fiction by the American-Irish author Anne McCaffrey. All four stories are set on the fictional planet Pern; the book is one of two collections in the science fiction series Dragonriders of Pern by Anne and her son Todd McCaffrey.

The collection
The stories are not united by any theme, but three of four are set about 2500 years "After Landing", the beginning of human settlement on Pern. That is just before or during the "Ninth Pass" of the "Red Star", an erratic planet that periodically brings a biological menace from space. Those three stories therefore share a Pernese historical period with most of the previous books in the series (11 of 16).

The seventeenth Dragonriders of Pern book, A Gift of Dragons was the last one in the series written by Anne McCaffrey alone, before the entry of her son Todd (see Dragon's Kin). It was published first in the US and four months later in the UK with the same cover art, by Del Rey Books and Bantam UK, two imprints of Random House. Three of the four stories were previously published, one as a small book.

The Smallest Dragonboy
 Published in Science Fiction Tales (1973), ed. Roger Elwood, and later in Creatures of the Cosmos (1977), ed. Catherine Crook de Camp, Top Fantasy: The Authors' Choice (1985), ed. Josh Pachter, and the Get Off the Unicorn collection. Also published as a 12 page p/b in 1982 by Dragonhold Limited, Kilquade, Greystones, County Wicklow, Ireland with cover illustration sketch by Linda Albritten as a "special limited convention edition" for Albacon II, the 1983 UK Eastercon (200 copies). 

"The Smallest Dragonboy" is set during the Ninth Pass. It tells of Keevan, a boy who is a candidate for Ramoth's latest clutch in Benden Weyr. Keevan is shorter than the other candidates, and is teased about this by Beterli, a boy who has stood for eight Impressions and has not been chosen. Keevan works hard but his size downgrades his abilities to most. When he overhears some of the senior dragonriders talking about dropping some of the younger candidates from the Impression, Keevan automatically thinks he will be dropped. The next day, when shoveling coal, Keevan gets in a fight with Beterli, who says he will be dropped. Keevan is badly injured and is assured by Lessa that he will have other Hatchings. When the Hatching occurs, Keevan manages to find his way to the Ground and Impresses a bronze dragon named Heth.

The Girl Who Heard Dragons
 Published as a Cheap Street book (1986) and as the cover story of The Girl Who Heard Dragons (1994 collection)

"The Girl Who Heard Dragons" is set during the Ninth Pass. It tells of Aramina, a holdless girl who is pursued by Lady Holdless Thella for her ability to hear dragons. She is continually chased, briefly held, and rescued by K'van and Heth after being held hostage.

Runner of Pern
 Published in Legends (1998), ed. Robert Silverberg

"Runner of Pern" is set shortly before the Ninth Pass. It tells of a runner (messenger) named Tenna, who is new to the craft her family has been in for generations. After being accepted as an apprentice runner, Tenna begins her career, running from one end of Pern's Northern Continent to the other. During her first run to Fort Hold, Tenna is almost to her destination, running on the "trace" (paths marked by moss that are reserved for runners only) when a rider on a fast runner beast runs her off the trace. Tenna falls into a sticklebush, which are covered in sharp spines at this time of the year. The spines of the sticklebush can be dangerous as they can cause infections or enter the bloodstream. She manages to get to a runner station, where she recovers from the fall.

After telling the manager about the incident, she gains a name: Haligon, the older of Lord Groghe's two sons. Haligon is known by the other runners at the Fort Hold Station to have used the traces before, nearly causing other accidents. After healing at the station for three days, Tenna goes to the Fort Hold Gather, where she identifies Haligon with some help from her new runner friends and by his stance (arrogant and haughty). After planning on how best to humiliate him, she walks up and punches Haligon, knocking him unconscious and landing him in a pile of dung. While walking back to her friends, speaks with one of the young men in Haligon's group, asking why she had attacked Haligon. Once back with her friends, she learns that she had actually attacked Haligon's twin brother Horon, the nice young man who spoke with her was actually Haligon. Worried that she may get in trouble, Tenna and her friends are met by Lord Groghe, who sincerely apologizes for his son's errors and advises the runners that Haligon will not use their traces any more. Tenna is then met by Haligon himself, who apologizes again for his actions and asks Tenna to be his guest at the gather. She accepts and after spending the entire gather with Haligon, begins to feel strong feelings for the man, which are returned in kind by Haligon.

Ever the Twain
 Original to the collection

"Ever the Twain" was the only story original to the collection. It tells of twins, Neru and Nian, who are inseparable. The brother Neru dreams of being a dragonrider; the sister Nian is more practical. The two live at a hold on Ista Island. One day, when dragons come to Search, they identify Nian as a good candidate for the queen, but she will not go without Neru. The dragons take them both on Search, along with Nian's friend Orla and another boy called Chaum. At the Weyr, Orla tells Nian that another girl, named Robina, has been promised the queen. The twins work in the infirmary for a day, but on Impression, the queen dragon hatches and Nian Impresses her and learns her name is Quinth.

The two of them manage to break the egg Neru is next to, revealing a bronze dragon named Larinth, whom Neru impresses. Later, in the weyrlings' barracks, N'ru tells Nian that he was upset that she was chosen on Search and he was taken along as a mere afterthought. Nian tells him that she never wanted his dream, she wanted him to be happy. They contemplate the fact that Nian and Quinth would probably be transferred to another Weyr. Quinth assures them that they will always be held together by their dragons, and that they would never be alone.

Notes

References

External links

2002 short story collections
Fantasy short story collections
Science fiction short story collections
Dragonriders of Pern books
Del Rey books